Nasser Abelfatah Ibrahim Iraq is an Egyptian writer and journalist. A graduate of Cairo University, he has worked as a cultural correspondent in both Egypt and Dubai. He is the co-founder and managing editor of the Dubai-based Al-Thaqafiya magazine.

His books include: 
 A History of Journalistic Art in Egypt (2002) (winner of the inaugural Ahmad Bahaa al-Din Prize) 
 Times of the Dust (2006) 
 From the Excess of Love (2008)
 The Green and the Damaged (2009) 
 The Unemployed (2011) (nominated for the Arabic Booker Prize)
 ‘’Al Ezbkeya’’ (2016) winner of the katara prize 
He lives and works in Dubai.

References

Egyptian writers